Rotten.com was a shock site active from 1996 to 2012. The website, which had the tagline "An archive of disturbing illustration", was devoted to morbid curiosities, pictures of violent acts, deformities, autopsy or forensic photographs, depictions of perverse sex acts, and disturbing or misanthropic historical curiosities. Founded in 1996, it was run by a developer known as Soylent Communications. Site updates slowed in 2009, with the final update in February 2012. The website's front page was last archived in February 2018.

History 
In late 1996, Soylent wrote a program that identified unregistered Internet domain names consisting of one word with a corresponding dictionary entry. "Rotten" was one of the unclaimed words, and Soylent went on to register rotten.com in the same year. Rotten.com presented itself as a bastion of online free speech, in an era when censorship rules in some countries had begun to restrict internet access.

Rotten.com had a spartan layout; no thumbnail images were present next to links, and the links had one-line descriptions couched in morbid humor, often carrying no hints at their content. Content consisted of user-submitted images, with developers rarely posting content themselves. Though submissions were marked as "real", often they were misattributed; in one instance, a file submitted as "motorcycle.jpg" was given the description of depicting a motorbike accident, but the developers admitted it was probably an attempted shotgun suicide.

Rotten.com received an alleged image of medical personnel recovering Princess Diana's body from a car accident, though this was later confirmed as fake. However, due to wide interest in the crash, the image was posted anyway, resulting in a large traffic spike. The website was also one of the first websites to publish images of the September 11 jumpers from the Twin Towers, under the title "Swan Dive".

Legal disputes
Rotten.com was threatened with many lawsuits over the years, mostly in the form of cease and desist notices. These ranged from serious matters, such as requests to remove pictures of dead relatives from the site, to Burlington Coat Factory asking to take down 'trenchcoat.org', a domain bought by Rotten.com as a Trenchcoat Mafia reference, though it simply linked to Burlington Coat Factory's webpage.

On June 24, 2005, the US federal government ordered that the "Fuck of the Month" section of the site be removed, along with content from several ancillary sites. In posting the page's removal notice, the site's moderator criticized supporters of both Alberto Gonzales and the Bush Administration for the enablement of censorship.

Rotten Library 
In 2003, The Rotten Library was created as an encyclopedia to supplement the website. The Library contained hundreds of articles under 17 different headings, including culture, art, medicine, crime, travel, and the occult. Articles contained detailed research, timelines, and occasionally included previously unseen images of various well-known events. The headings inside of entries are humorous in nature, with a description of the subject (for example, a medical condition) in an informal and often insulting tone. In the entry dedicated to eating disorders, the heading above the section for bulimia is titled "Betty Bulimia."

Merchandise 
Rotten.com had a store that carried t-shirts, mousemats, stickers, magnets, and bizarre DVDs.

Ancillary sites

The Daily Rotten 
In late 1999, The Daily Rotten was started by Thomas E. Dell, which published stories on a daily basis, focusing mostly on terrorism, murder, suicide, abuse and excrement. Daily Rotten, also known as Rotten News, is driven by user submissions, which are edited by a self-described "Rotten Staff Duder". This also features comments for each one of the articles, posted by the registered members; they usually bring similar histories or gruesome images. They refer to themselves as "rotteneers", a satirical reference to Walt Disney's Mouseketeers, and/or "rottentots".

Boners.com 
Rotten.com launched Boners.com in response to viewers who wanted a daily pictures page alongside the Daily Rotten newsboard. The word "boner" suggests an embarrassing mistake or a male organ in a state of arousal. The images typically consisted of amusing public signs, phallic imagery, and members of the public in embarrassing situations.

The Gaping Maw 
In 2000, The Gaping Maw – an editorial/commentary archive – was founded. Most of the articles were written by cartoonist Tristan Farnon under the alias "Spigot" (from Leisure Town) or by other webmasters. The pages contained news, satire, and commentary on modern society. Along with the Rotten Library, this improved Rotten.com's standing in many communities since it introduced a humane and intellectual aspect to the website. On June 22, 2005, The Gaping Maw went dark to comply with new government bookkeeping requirements regarding the distribution of pornography, specifically governmental age-verification of models, under . All articles were taken down, and the site's title page was replaced with a statement lamenting the passage of the laws, headed by the banner, "CENSORED BY US GOVERNMENT!". In January 2006, The Gaping Maw came back online with some articles heavily edited.

Rotten Dead Pool 
In November 2003, the Rotten Dead Pool was launched. The Dead Pool was a game in which players picked ten people they believed would die over the course of the next 12 months. A point was awarded to a player for each of their correct picks. A pick did not count as correct if the pick was executed or murdered, or died some other way, after the 12 months had passed.

NNDB 
In mid-2002, Rotten.com launched NNDB, an online database. NNDB is a steadily-updated website that contained information about thousands of notable people. The news section ceased updating on January 16, 2016, and the celebrity deaths section last updated on December 31, 2021. The website itself is still live.

Sports Dignity 
Sports Dignity was a gallery of pictures showing embarrassing or NSFW incidents in sports games and tournaments.

Publications 
  (pp. 194–204 consists of the Rotten Library entry for John Ashcroft)

References

External links
 Original Rotten Library

 
 
 Original Source Code/Mirror

Shock sites
Internet properties established in 1997
Internet properties disestablished in 2017
Online obscenity controversies